Atta cephalotes is a species of leafcutter ant in the tribe Attini (the fungus-growing ants). A single colony of ants can contain up to 5 million members, and each colony has one queen that can live more than 15 years. The colony comprises different castes, known as "task partitioning", and each caste has a different job to do.

Taxonomy
The species is one of the earliest formally classified ants, first described by Swedish zoologist Carl Linnaeus in 1758 as Formica cephalotes in the 10th edition of Systema Naturae together with 16 other ant species, all of which he placed in the genus Formica. It was later transferred to a new genus, Atta, along with five other species by Danish zoologist Johan Christian Fabricius in 1804. In 1911, American entomologist William Morton Wheeler designated A. cephalotes as the type species of Atta. It was also designated as the type species of Oecodoma, but the genus is now a synonym of Atta.

Biology and behaviour
A special caste of workers manages the colony's rubbish dump.  These ants are excluded from the rest of the colony.  If any wander outside the dump, the other ants will kill them or force them back.  Rubbish workers are often contaminated with disease and toxins, and live only half as long as their peers.

Distribution and habitat
The species is widely distributed in the Neotropical region, from Mexico to Bolivia, with disjunct populations in Amazonas and north-eastern Brazil.

Across the rainforest floor they typically occupy an area of approximately 20 square feet. They live in nests that can be as deep as 7 metres that they have carefully positioned so that a breeze can rid the nest of the dangerous levels of  given off by the fungus they farm and eat.

References

External links
 
 

C
Hymenoptera of North America
Hymenoptera of South America
Insects of Central America
Hymenoptera of Brazil
Insects of Mexico
Neotropical realm fauna
Ants described in 1758
Taxa named by Carl Linnaeus